Journey to Spirit Island is a 1988 U.S. Emmy Award-winning family adventure film directed by Lásló Pal, produced by Bruce Clark, with a screenplay by Crane Webster from a story by Lásló Pal and Crane Webster. It stars Bettina Bush, Brandon Douglas and Marie Antoinette Rodgers. The cinematography is by the Oscar-winning Vilmos Zsigmond.

On the Olympic Peninsula and a nearby, unspoilt San Juan island; a young Native American girl, her brother and their two new friends battle land developers determined to build a holiday resort on the sacred burial site that is Spirit Island.

Plot
Two brothers Michael (Brandon Douglas) and Willie (Gabriel Damon) are on vacation from Chicago to Spirit Island with a teenaged Native American girl named Maria (Bettina Bush) and her brother. They plan to save Spirit Island to preserve their heritage, when a conflict arises regarding the development of tribal burial grounds. When her Grandma organizes a protest against defiling their ancestors' sacred burial ground, Maria takes up the cudgel. The villains are land developers who seek to transform Spirit Island into a vacation resort.

Cast
Bettina Bush as Maria
Brandon Douglas as Michael
Marie Antoinette Rodgers as Jimmy Jim
Gabriel Damon as Willie
Tarek McCarthy as Klim
Tony Acierto as Hawk
Nick Ramus as Tom
Atilla Gambasci as Phil
Rod Gibbens as Peter Mackel
Frank Salsedo as Hoots
Skeeter Vaughan as Harry
Edie Hottowe as Lucy

Release
"Journey to Spirit Island" went unreleased until 1992 when it premiered in the U.S. on the Disney Channel.

Reception
The TV Guide Reviewer of "Journey to Spirit Island" commented: "This film, beautifully photographed by topnotch cinematographer Vilmos Zsigmond, is good hearted family fare marred by a hopelessly naïve conclusion".The reviewer added: "...Ostensibly a lesson in environmental protection, respect for Native American culture and the exploitation of that culture by the 'white man', 'Journey to Spirit Island' negates what impact it might have had by making an Indian the villain and a white businessman the noble hero".

Hal Erickson for Allmovie,  praised "the superlative photography by Vilmos Zsigmond.

In his review for the Radio Times, John Ferguson concluded: "The members of a largely unknown cast give winning performances, director Laszlo Pal expertly brings together the mystical and adventure elements of the tale and the rugged northern locations are gloriously captured by Zsigmond".

Award
"Journey to Spirit Island" received the following award:
1993 Emmy Award: Directing, Children's Special to Lázsló Pal for "Journey to Spirit Island".(Disney)

References

External links
 

1988 films
Films about Native Americans
1980s English-language films